Vraňany is a municipality and village in Mělník District in the Central Bohemian Region of the Czech Republic. It has about 900 inhabitants.

Administrative parts
The village of Mlčechvosty is an administrative part of Vraňany.

References

Villages in Mělník District